Eelam War III is the name given to the third phase of armed conflict between the Sri Lankan military and the separatist Liberation Tigers of Tamil Eelam (LTTE). 

After the period of 100 days cease-fire the hostilities broke out on 19 April 1995. The LTTE - Sea Tigers planted explosives in two gun boats known as SLNS 'Sooraya' and 'Ranasuru', and blew them up. 

Also, a new weapon "Stinger", a shoulder-launched anti-aircraft missile was used in this conflict by the LTTE. This was used to take down two Sri Lankan Air Force AVRO aircraft flying over the Jaffna peninsula. 

Eelam War III also marked the rising success of the LTTE, as they managed to capture key districts such as Kilinochchi and Mullaitivu, and took over the Elephant Pass base. By the end of Eelam War III, the LTTE had control of nearly 30% of the entire island.

Major military operations (in chronological order)

 19 April 1995: The LTTE sinks SLNS Sooraya and SLNS Ranasuru ending peace talks. 

 28 June 1995: The LTTE overruns the Sri Lankan military base at Mandaitivu. 

 28 July 1995: The LTTE attack the Sri Lankan military base at Weli Oya and is repulsed with heavy loses. 

 17 October - 5 December 1995 : Government launches Operation Riviresa -recapturing the Jaffna peninsular from the LTTE.

 July 18, 1996 : The LTTE overruns the Sri Lankan military base at Mullaitivu, the attack carried out after midnight. The number of killed in action and missing in action were around 1600 as per military sources. There were more than 4000 LTTE cadre's participated the attack and captured large quantity of arms and military equipment. The base was used as Sri Lanka Army's 215 Brigade Headquarters. One of the major encounters broke out between the LTTE and the Special Forces (SF) commando reinforcements Lt. Col. Laphir and 36 others were killed and 60 more were wounded. Sri Lanka Air-force pilots landed the second batch of Commando's in the same location and also taken the dead body of Lt. Col.Laphir by rope pulled down from the helicopter under heavy LTTE gunfire. The code name given by the LTTE "Oyatha Alaikal" (Endless Waves) to attack the Mullaitivu Military base and SLA code was named as "Operation Thrivida Pahara" for the rescue mission.
 Operation Sathjaya 1997: SLA launched Operation Sathjaya to capture Kilinochchi from LTTE. After 70 days of siege Army finally captured Kilinochchi.
 Operation Jayasikurui (1997-1998): In May 1997 SLA launched Operation Jayasikurui (Sure Victory) to open land route to Jaffna Peninsula. The main objective of the operation was to liberate   A9 Highway from Vavuniya to Kilinochchi. The total distance was approximately 70 km. Army abandoned this operation after 18 months without achieving its main goal. 
 Operation Unceasing Waves II: LTTE launched Operation Unceasing Waves II also known as 1998 Battle of Kilinochchi. . LTTE recaptured Kilinochchi town from Army after 3 days of intense battle. 
 Operation Ranagosha (Battle cry): It was carried out in 4 phases. Army captured more than 500sq.km. of LTTE territory in Vanni (Sri Lanka).
 Operation Rivibala: It was a secret operation launched by Army to capture Oddusuddan. It was an important LTTE base near LTTE's stronghold Mullaitivu. 
 Operation Unceasing Waves III: LTTE launched Operation Unceasing Waves III on the first week of November 1999. On first day LTTE began Oddusuddan offensive (1999). After capturing the base they attacked Kanakarayankulam Army HQ. After the fall of the base LTTE recaptured most part of Vanni .
 Second Battle of Elephant Pass: LTTE after liberating Vanni launched their attack to liberate Jaffna Peninsula. Known as Second Battle of Elephant Pass LTTE stepped up operation inside Jaffna Peninsula. Under the leadership of Kandiah Balasegaran LTTE launched SL Civil War's largest behind enemy line operation. After 34 days long battle Elephant Pass  base fell to Tamil Tigers.
 Operation Unceasing Waves IV: On 26 September 2000 LTTE launched Operation Unceasing Waves IV. The objective of the operation was to capture Jaffna.
 LTTE's Unilateral ceasefire: On 24 December 2000 LTTE declared Unilateral ceasefire. It was ended on 24 April 2001. 
 Operation Agni keela: Army launched Operation Agnikeela on 25 April 2001within few hours after LTTE ended their unilateral ceasefire. Its main objective was to retake Elephant Pass Garrison which they lost to LTTE one year back. LTTE had Booby trap whole paths and effectively positioned their artillery and mortar units. Due to heavy casualties, the army abandoned the operation.
 2002 Peace Process: After few rounds of talks Sri Lankan Government and LTTE signed permanent ceasefire on 22 February 2002. Thus Eelam War III came to an end.

Civilian killings

Kallarawa massacre

The Kallarawa massacre is an incident on May 25, 1995 during which LTTE cadres massacred 42 Sinhalese men, women and children in Kallarawa. All the remaining civilian survivors fled the village after this incident leading to its depopulation. However survivors from the Sinhalese, Tamil and Muslim communities have returned to Kallarawa under the protection of the Sri Lankan Army.

Gonagala massacre

The Gonagala Massacre was a massacre that occurred on September 18, 1999, in the small village of Gonagala, located in the Ampara District of Sri Lanka. According to reports, over 50 men, women and children were hacked to death in the middle of the night. The massacre is attributed to the LTTE, which is banned as a terrorist organization by a number of countries including the United States, the United Kingdom, India and the European Union.

The Gonagala massacre is one of several such attacks believed to have been carried out by the LTTE. However these murders gained notoriety because, unlike previous attacks, most of the LTTE cadres who took part in it were women. According to survivors, there was a significant presence of female cadres among the 75 LTTE cadres who took part in the killings

Controversy over the Army's handling of its casualties and their families 
In August 2001, S. P. Thamilselvan, the leader of the political wing of the Tamil Tigers, accused the Sri Lankan Army of intentionally abandoning the bodies of nearly a thousand soldiers on the battlefields since May, despite the Tamils’ request that the Red Cross act as an intermediate.  He told visiting relatives of missing servicemen that the military had only accepted 55 bodies to return to their families, while burying the rest with full military honors on the spot. Thamilselvan did not offer a reason for the army's refusal, but did note that several hundred decomposing bodies remained in a minefield due to the danger of extracting them. A Sri Lankan military spokesman, Brigadier Sanath Karunaratne, acknowledged that the army cannot always retrieve a body because it might cost more lives, but denied the Tamil accusations, saying they were propaganda aimed at demoralizing the parents of the missing soldiers.

However, this was not the first time issues had arisen over reclamation of soldiers’ remains and the Army's responsiveness to the requests of families of missing soldiers for information regarding their fate.  In April 2003, a group of parents of some of the 619 soldiers reported missing from a battle fought 27 September 1998 obtained permission from the LTTE to travel to the battle site.  The families’ previous inquiries at the Defense Ministry, the Sri Lankan Army, and the International Committee of the Red Cross for information on their sons’ fates had been fruitless.  At the battlefield they learned that some 500 bodies had been piled together, doused with kerosene, and burnt on the spot by the Sri Lankan Army.  Upon their return, a lawsuit was filed on the families’ behalf requesting a mass funeral and DNA testing so Buddhist, Muslim and Christian families could collect their sons’ remains and give them proper burials.  The Ministry of Defence organized funeral in 2006, but declined to perform the requested DNA testing.

Killing of prisoners by the LTTE 
Although it had stated that it abides by the Third Geneva Convention for the treatment of prisoners of war, it has been accused of mass execution and torture of captured soldiers in the Battle of Mullaitivu and in the Battle of Vavunathivu.

See also

Eelam War I
Eelam War II
Eelam War IV
Sri Lankan Civil War

References

External links
Ministry of Defence, Sri Lanka
GoSL Peace Secretariat
LTTE Peace Secretariat
Sri Lanka Monitoring Mission
Lanka Academic, news site sponsored by Sri Lankan academics worldwide
 Sangam.org
 Texts of key agreements in the peace process and an analysis of the process by Conciliation Resources
 Report on the Sri Lankan peace process by Asiafoundation
 hWeb - Sri Lanka’s recent history of ethnic conflict and political crisis originates from its colonial legacy
 NorthEast Secretariat report on Human rights 1974-2004
hWeb - Sri Lanka’s recent history of ethnic conflict originates from its colonial legacy
 Peace&War: Humanity Ashore Pictorial
  Sri Lanka's Profile Timeline

 
Phases of the Sri Lankan Civil War
1990s in Sri Lanka
2000s in Sri Lanka
1990s conflicts
2000s conflicts
Counterterrorism in Sri Lanka
Guerrilla wars
Tamil Eelam
History of Sri Lanka (1948–present)
Military history of Sri Lanka
1995 in Sri Lanka
1996 in Sri Lanka
1997 in Sri Lanka
1998 in Sri Lanka
1999 in Sri Lanka
2000 in Sri Lanka
2001 in Sri Lanka
2002 in Sri Lanka
Sri Lankan Civil War